Dichomeris externella is a moth in the family Gelechiidae. It was described by Zeller in 1852. It is found in South Africa and Zimbabwe.

References

Moths described in 1852
externella